Habitants were French settlers and the inhabitants of French origin who farmed the land along the two shores of the St. Lawrence River and Gulf in what is the present-day Province of Quebec in Canada. The term was used by the inhabitants themselves and the other classes of French Canadian society from the 17th century up until the early 20th century when the usage of the word declined in favour of the more modern agriculteur (farmer) or producteur agricole (agricultural producer).

Habitants in New France were largely defined by a condition on the land, stating that it could be forfeited unless it was cleared within a certain period of time. This condition kept the land from being sold by the seigneur, leading instead to its being sub-granted to peasant farmers, the habitants. When a habitant was granted the title deed to a lot, he had to agree to accept a variety of annual charges and restrictions.  Rent was the most important of these and could be set in money, produce or labour.  Once this rent was set, it could not be altered, neither due to inflation or time. A habitant was essentially free to develop his land as he wished, with only a few obligations to his seigneur.

Likewise, a seigneur did not have many responsibilities towards his habitants. The seigneur was obligated to build a gristmill for his tenants, and they, in turn, were required to grind their grain there and provide the seigneur with one sack of flour out of every 14. The seigneur also had the right to a specific number of days of forced labour by the habitants and could claim rights over fishing, timber and common pastures.

Though the demands of the seigneurs became more significant at the end of French rule, they could never obtain enough resources from the rents and fees imposed on the habitants alone to become truly wealthy, nor leave their tenants in poverty. Habitants were free individuals; seigneurs simply owned a "bundle of specific and limited rights over productive activity within that territory". The seigneur – habitant relationship was one where both parties were owners of the land who split the attributes of ownership between them.

Economy and taxes

Most habitants grew crops that satisfied their own household needs for food and clothing rather than grow crops to sell on the market. Seigneurial farmers took this subsistence approach because of the smaller market that existed in Quebec. There had always been an exceedingly high number of farmers in New France and even in the early history of Quebec. It is estimated that in 1851 about 70% of Quebec's inhabitants were farmers. In the eastern United States, these numbers were drastically different: the earliest census data on this topic shows that in 1870 only 13% of residents in Massachusetts and 25% of residents in New York state were farmers. At this time, the agricultural sector still accounted for over half of the Quebec working population.  These contrasting numbers meant that the Quebec farmer served an internal market only 1/3 the size of the market available to the average New York farmer. This smaller market in New France meant that habitants had little surplus wealth. Despite the lack of excess income, habitants still had to pay a variety of annual dues for the land received from a seigneur.

There were certain responsibilities or "duties" that came with receiving a free plot of land from the seigneur. Firstly, habitants were expected to cultivate and live on the land. If a piece of land was not cultivated within a year, the seigneur had the "droit de réunion," meaning the right of repossession. Secondly, there were several dues that habitants had to pay to the seigneur. One due was the "cens", which ranged between 2 and 6 sols. This charge was mostly symbolic, since it was a fairly paltry sum. Rent was typically set at an annual rate of 20 sols for every "arpent" of land, and a significant expense would typically be paid each year by habitants to the seigneur towards fees for livestock grazing on the villages' common fields, wood harvesting, etc. Seigneurs also received "lods et ventes" if habitants sold their land, which was equivalent to one-twelfth of the sale price. Another duty of habitants was to grind wheat at the seigneurial mill and pay a fee of one-fourteenth of the wheat ground. Some habitants also owed the seigneur one-thirteenth of the total amount of fish they caught. In addition, some habitants were responsible for completing 1–4 days of mandatory work during the sowing, harvesting, or haying season, which were called "corvées". Habitants were expected to fulfill all of these obligations to repay the seigneur for granting them land in the first place.

Family life

The habitants went to New France to find a better life and so that they would have better farming opportunities.  They also moved to New France so they could have larger land holdings which eventually they would pass on to their children.

For women, most of the adulthood was spent being a wife and raising children.  Marriage was essential for the women of New France and widowers often remarried. Due to the significantly greater male population, women often had their choice of partner and arranged marriages were infrequent. Some women were paid by the King of France to boost the population.  They were called Filles du Roi.

The church played an important role in the life of a habitant; it was the parish that recorded all the births, marriages and deaths in the colony. These important events in the habitant life were considered religious traditions and marked by rituals. Nevertheless, parishes only developed in areas with a significant population. The habitants provided the local church and rectory, which was commonly used as a place of meeting and as a community hall, and emergency food stores were often kept in the churches attic. The habitants also viewed Sunday Mass not only as a time for worship but also as a time for communal gathering and socializing.

See also 

 Seigneurial system of New France
Indentured servitude in British America
Serfdom

References

 Sources

External links

 Government of Canada, Canadian Museum of Civilization - The Habitant in New France

 
French Canadian culture
French-American culture in Missouri
French-Canadian culture in the United States
New France
17th century in Quebec
Pre-Confederation Quebec people